The Wiener Festwochen (Vienna Festival) is a cultural festival in Vienna that takes place every year for five or six weeks in May and June. The Wiener Festwochen was established in 1951, when Vienna was still occupied by the four Allies. 

The opening of the Wiener Festwochen is an open-air event with free admission held in the square in front of Vienna’s City Hall.

Each year the festival attracts about 180,000 visitors.

Directors
Directors of the festival include:
1951–1958: Adolph Ario
1959: Rudolf Gamsjäger
1960–1964: Egon Hilbert
1964–1977: Ulrich Baumgartner
1978–1979: Gerhard Freund
1980–1984: Helmut Zilk
1984–1991: Ursula Pasterk
1991–1996: Klaus Bachler
1997–2001: Luc Bondy / Klaus-Peter Kehr / Hortensia Völckers
2002–2013: Luc Bondy 
2014–2016: Markus Hinterhäuser
2017–2021: Tomas Zierhofer-Kin
2019–present: Christophe Slagmuylder, whose term ends in 2024

See also
List of opera festivals

References

External links

Festivals in Vienna
Theatre festivals in Austria
Festivals established in 1951
Arts festivals in Austria
Cultural festivals in Austria
Spring (season) events in Austria
1951 establishments in Austria